Gashkino is a rural locality (a village) in Denisovskoye Rural Settlement, Gorokhovetsky District, Vladimir Oblast, Russia. The population was 7 as of 2010.

Geography 
Gashkino is located on the bank of the Gashkinsky pond, 20 km southwest of Gorokhovets (the district's administrative centre) by road. Murakovo is the nearest rural locality.

References 

Rural localities in Gorokhovetsky District